Hussainabad block is one of the administrative blocks of Palamu district, Jharkhand state, India. According to census (2001), the block has 29,113 households with aggregate population of 177,013. The block has 183 villages. Its largest town is Hussainabad, also known as Japla.

References
Blocks of Palamu district

Community development blocks in Palamu district